Moist Esports is an esports organization founded in 2021. The organization currently has teams competing in Guilty Gear Strive, Rocket League, Super Smash Bros. Melee, Super Smash Bros. Ultimate, Brawlhalla, Valorant, and Apex Legends. Their Rocket League division won Rocket League Championship Series 2021–22 Spring Split Major event in July 2022.

History
On August 11, 2021, Internet personality Charles White, Jr., known as Cr1TiKaL, announced the signing of Super Smash Bros. Ultimate player Kolawole "Kola" Aideyan and the formation of Moist Esports. By September, the organization expanded into two more esports, Guilty Gear Strive and Super Smash Bros. Melee. On May 5, 2022, Moist Esports created their Rocket League division after signing the former players of Team Queso.

On September 21, 2022, White revealed that he runs Moist Esports at a net loss. In the same video, he rallied 11 million of his subscribers to join Team Moist in the Omega Strikers event. The prize of the event awards the winning team 3% of the net revenue garnered during the first season of the game, and Team Moist took first place with over 2 million wins.

On January 25, 2023, Moist Esports announced that Ludwig Ahgren has joined as a co-owner, along with Nick Allen.

On February 26, 2023, Moist Esports expanded into Valorant with their team Moist Moguls. It was formed after the acquisition of Team BreakThru, and is the first expansion of Moist Esports after the arrival of Ludwig.

Divisions

Apex Legends
On September 6, 2022, Moist Esports announced the creation of an Apex Legends team, signing three players from the former Team Burger.

Guilty Gear Strive
On August 31, 2021, Moist Esports created their Guilty Gear Strive division after signing Evo 2021 Online Guilty Gear Strive Champion Julian "Hotashi" Harris.

Rocket League
On May 5, 2022, Moist Esports created their Rocket League division after signing the former players of Team Queso; Joe "Joyo" Young, Finlay "rise." Ferguson and Axel "Vatira" Touret. The team went on to win the Rocket League Championship Series 2021–22 Spring Split Major event in London, on July 3, 2022. In the 2022 Rocket League Championship Series World Championship, Moist Esports lost to FURIA Esports,  4–3, in the quarterfinals. On September 8 Axel "Vatira" Touret was removed from the starting roster and then released on the 20th. Then, on September 21 Moist announced the signing of Maëllo "AztraL" Ernst. On January 9, 2023 it was announced that rise. would be leaving Moist for Oxygen eSports.  He was replaced by Charles "juicy" Sabiani on January 12.

Super Smash Bros.
Moist Esports' first first-ever signing was Super Smash Bros. Ultimate player Kolawole "Kola" Aideyan on August 11, 2021. The organization signed a second Super Smash Bros. Ultimate player later that month named Aaron "Aaron" Wilhite. The team debuted at Beyond the Summit's Smash Ultimate Summit Three event. The organization entered the Super Smash Bros. Melee esports scene after signing Kurtis "moky" Pratt in September 2021. By April 2022, the team had signed a total of four players to their Ultimate division.

Valorant 
On February 26, 2023, Moist Esports expanded into Valorant, with their team Moist Moguls. It was formed by the acquisition of  Team BreakThru, including all of the 5 active players, the head coach, and their manager apex (Austin Copeland).

Rosters

References 

Esports teams based in the United States
Esports teams established in 2021
Super Smash Bros. player sponsors
Rocket League teams
Apex Legends teams
Valorant teams